Spoon Breakfast EP is an extended play disc released just before the group's debut album, Gub. It is now a heavily sought after Pigface collectible. Chris Connelly only appears on the first track; the rest are done by Martin Atkins and others.

Track listing
 "Tonight's the Night (Little Sisters) (Remix)" (Martin Atkins, Chris Connelly, Bill Rieflin, William Tucker)
 "Winnebago Induced Tapeworm (Remix)" (Martin Atkins, Ogilvie, Bill Rieflin)
 "Bushmaster Bushmaster (Remix)" (Martin Atkins, Bill Rieflin, David Yow)
 "War Ich Nicht Immer Ein Guter Junge? (Remix)" (Martin Atkins, En Esch, Bill Rieflin)

References

External links
 

Pigface albums
1990 EPs